Armand Dousemont (born 15 July 1952) is a Luxembourgian sports shooter. He competed in two events at the Atlanta 1996 Summer Olympics. On 1 June 2005 he came in joint second (with Frans Pace) at the Trap competition.

References

1952 births
Living people
Luxembourgian male sport shooters
Olympic shooters of Luxembourg
Shooters at the 1996 Summer Olympics
Sportspeople from Luxembourg City